France Charbonneau is a Canadian judge sitting on the Quebec Superior Court. She was appointed on 4 October 2004.

Crown Attorney
Charbonneau began her legal career in the 1970s as a legal secretary and complained that many of the grand seigneur lawyers whom she worked treated her a patronizing sexist manner, which inspired her to go into law school to study the law herself. Charbonneau served as a Crown attorney in Quebec for 26 years, beginning in 1979, and worked at as a legal aid lawyer. As a Crown, Charbonneau tried over 80 murder cases, including that of Maurice Boucher, and served as a prosecutor on Operation Carcajou. Charbonneau tried 80 murder cases and won convictions in 79.

In 1998, Charbonneau served as an assistant Crown Attorney aiding the main Crown Attorney, Jacques Dagnais, at the first murder trial of Boucher. Boucher's attorney, Jacques Larochelle, was a well respected Quebec City defense lawyer noted for suave, courtly manner; speaking his French with a strong upper class accent; and his ability to tear apart the credibility of the Crown's witnesses on the stand via a series of sharp, probing questions. Larochelle during his cross-examination of the Crown's star witness, Stéphane Gagné, was able to force Gagné to admit under oath that he had "no respect for the truth", a damming statement that he used to argue that Gagné had committed perjury. The trial ended in Boucher's acquittal. Charbonneau stated she was not impressed with Larochelle, saying that he struck her as the type of arrogant, upper class male attorney who had no respect for the abilities of female lawyers and that she found his upper-class accent and mannerisms patronizing and offensive.   

In a rare legal move, Charbonneau challenged double jeopardy and on 10 October 2000, the Quebec Court of Appeals ordered a new trial for Boucher on the grounds that the judge at the 1998 trial, Justice Jean-Guy Boilard, had been biased towards the defense in his conduct of the trial and in his jury instructions. Charbonneau stated: "The courtroom is my living room. It's my home". Charbonneau described herself as a woman very passionate about the law who greatly enjoyed the sparring and arguing promoted by the adversarial English common law system used for criminal cases in Canada, where the courtrooms are the scenes of all-out struggles between the Crown attorneys vs. the defense counsel. 

Charbonneau prosecuted Boucher at his second trial in 2002. Boucher's first trial had ended with Larochelle portraying the Crown's main witness, the hitman Stéphane Gagné as unreliable and prone to perjury. Charbonneau ordered the police to review the evidence, and in turn the police found surveillance tapes that confirmed aspects of Gagné's testimony such as his statement that he was serving as Boucher's bodyguard on 5 December 1997 at a party to celebrate the 20th anniversary of the Hells Angels arrival in Canada. The police team had failed to fully examine the photographs, videotapes, wiretaps and phone records before the first trial and instead relied upon civilian analysts to log the evidence. The analysts not being professional policeman and policewomen had missed the significant evidence. Charbonneau also managed to have two police wiretaps of Boucher's cell phone calls that Justice Boilard had excluded as evidence at the 1998 trial introduced at the 2002 trial, which confirmed other aspects of Gagné's testimony.  Gagné stated that an used car dealer, Daniel Foster, had supplied the get-away vehicles used in the murders, and the two cell phones calls made by Boucher to Foster on 4 and 27 June 1997 showed that Boucher had just purchased two used cars that were of the same make and model as the get-away cars used in the murder of Diane Lavigne. Other police tapes confirmed the Hells Angels hierarchy precisely in the manner that Gagné had described, which Charbonneau as evidence at the trial he was telling the truth.  

Charbonneau was also helped by the fact that Serge Boutin, a leading Hells Angel had cut a deal with the Crown after he killed a police informer Claude Des Serres in February 2000. Boutin's testimony supported and confirmed Gagné's testimony. Boutin had been the boyfriend of the Hells Angel Paul "Fonfon" Fontaine who taken part in the second murder of the prison guard Pierre Rondeau alongside Gagné. Nancy Dubê, the teenager furniture store clerk, who testified at the first trial that she had seen Gagné flee from the burning get-away van after the murder of Pierre Rondeau, refused to testify at the second trial. Boucher had entered the store where she worked and starred at her intensely, which left Dubê so utterly terrified that she refused to testify as she stated that Boucher was a killer and a rapist who knew where she lived and worked. Charbonneau who spoken with Dubê in an unsuccessful attempt to persuade to testify stated: "She almost died of fright".     

The trial began on 26 March 2002. Charbonneau received constant death threats from the Hells Angels during the trial and was under 24-hour police guard. The trial was a bitter clash of wills as the journalists Julian Sher and William Marsden wrote: "The trial did not go smoothly. It was  four weeks of acid and vinegar. Charbonneau fought for every inch of what she gained. Larochelle tried to rally, but it was clear he was uncomfortable with the Crown's aggression...Not a sarcastic gesture or comment went unpunished. If he signed or shrugged, ooohed or aahed as he cross-examined Gagné, she repeatedly objected to his sarcasm". Charbonneau stated that Boucher was a killer and she was determined to see him convicted, regarding the trial as a sort of "war" against Larochelle and Boucher.

Charbonneau had the Hells Angels excluded the courtroom to prevent intimidation of the jury as she noticed at the first trial that jury seemed nervous at the presence of Hells Angels in the courtroom wearing their death's head patches on their biker vests. Charbonnneau did not permit joking in the courtroom and objected every time that Larcholle called Boucher "Mom" in an attempt to make him seem lovable, insisting that he be addressed as Monsieur Boucher. Charbonneau stated: "I am a woman of conviction. I don't play". Charbonneau regarded Larochelle as an arrogant grand seigneur, the type of lawyer who used to order her to get coffee when she was a legal secretary in the 1970s, and thought he had underestimated her because she was a woman. Charbonneau was convinced that Larochlle would blunder at some point and she carefully observed him, watching for any mistake on his part.

The key moment in the trial occurred when Gagné admitted to making mistakes when he gave his confession on 5 December 1997, saying he was tired. Larochelle stated: "I've seen the video. And you don't look tired." Charbonneau seized upon Larchelle's statement to show in rebuttal the videotape of Gagné, saying: "Let's see the video". In the videotape, Gagné was clearly exhausted as he had much difficulty staying awake in his chair. For the rest of the trial, Charbonneau put Larochelle on trial in a sense, portraying him as a dishonest lawyer who would tell any lie, no matter how egregious, to secure the acquittal of his client. In her final address to the jury, Charbonneau stated: "If I had not vigorously objected-an objection which my colleague so delicately described as a fit of hysterics-if I had not insisted that you see the video for yourselves, wouldn't you have been convinced, as Monsieur Larochelle had wanted, that Gagné lied when he said he was tired? Was that the search for the truth, the search for a just and fair trial?" 

The jury went into deliberations on 25 April 2002. On 5 May 2002, the jury convicted Boucher of two counts of first-degree murder and one count of attempted murder. At the end of the trial, Larochelle refused to shake hands with Charbonneau and instead walked out of the courtroom. Charbonneau smiled in the courtroom and congratulated her partner Yves Pardis. After the trial, Commander André Bouchard of the Service de police de la Ville de Montréal called Charbonneau to congratulate her. Bouchard recalled: "She was crying on the phone".

Judge
On the recommendation of François Rolland, then Chief Justice of the Court, Premier Jean Charest named Charbonneau to chair an inquiry into corruption in the Quebec construction industry on 9 November 2011. Charbonneau headed the inquiry—now known as the Charbonneau Commission—from 2011 to 2015. The Commission issued its final report on 24 November 2015.

In popular culture 
Charbonneau was portrayed by Claudia Ferri in the television drama series Bad Blood, which debuted in 2017, surrounding the Rizzuto crime family.

Books

References 

Living people
Year of birth missing (living people)
Canadian women lawyers
Judges in Quebec